A Thousand Horses is an American country music band formed in 2010 in Nashville, Tennessee. The band is composed of Michael Hobby (lead vocals), Bill Satcher (lead guitar), Zach Brown (guitar and vocals), and Graham Deloach (bass and vocals). Their first EP, A Thousand Horses, was released under Interscope Records in 2010. In 2014, the band signed with Republic Nashville of Big Machine Label Group and released its first single "Smoke", which set a record for the highest debut by a new act when it opened at number 28 on the Country Aircheck radio chart.

Biography
Michael Hobby and Bill Satcher grew up in Newberry, South Carolina, where they began writing songs at the age of 15. Satcher's cousin and Savannah, Georgia, native Graham DeLoach joined the duo soon after. A friend eventually introduced Atlanta native Zach Brown, and A Thousand Horses was formed. The name "A Thousand Horses" came from a song on their first EP. They enjoy writing their own original songs, but they occasionally collaborate with other writers around Nashville. They have toured nationwide and released their full-length album Southernality on January 21, 2015.

Bridges
Their "deluxe EP", Bridges, was released on June 2, 2017, with BMLG Records. Producing the new CD with Dann Huff and Corey Crowder, the band vowed to keep their unique sound intact. One of the featured songs on the record is a live version of their breakthrough hit "Smoke" recorded in Printer's Alley.

Southernality
Released June 9, 2015, Southernality is A Thousand Horses' debut album, released by Republic Nashville. The first single, "Smoke", has charted on Country Airplay and Hot Country Songs, reaching number one on the former chart, making A Thousand Horses the first country group to chart a number-one debut single since the Zac Brown Band's "Chicken Fried" reached number one in December 2008. Reviews have been generally positive commending their smooth vocals, lyrics, and blend of country and rock. The album's second single, "(This Ain't No) Drunk Dial", was released to country radio on June 29, 2015. The album's third single, the title track, was released to country radio on February 29, 2016.

A Thousand Horses

Their debut E.P., A Thousand Horses, was released on August 17, 2010, under Republic Nashville. It was recorded in six days in Silver Lake, California, with producer Dave Cobb.

The song "Suicide Eyes" from the E.P. was featured in the movie Footloose starring Kenny Wormald and Julianne Hough. The director, Craig Brewer, found the song and knew that it fit the vibe for the movie.

For their performance at the Austin City Limits festival in 2014, Rolling Stone hailed the band as the best up-and-comer, praising their "undeniable energy and stage presence [and] their live performance".

Influences
A Thousand Horses self-identifies as a hybrid of English rock, country, American rock, soul, and blues. Their sound mimics Lynyrd Skynyrd, the Allman Brothers, the Black Crowes, and the Rolling Stones in the context of modern country. Hobby's songwriting is rooted in such songwriters as Dwight Yoakam, Tom Petty, and Noel Gallagher.

Discography

Studio albums

Extended plays

Singles

Music videos

References

Country music groups from Tennessee
Musical groups from Nashville, Tennessee
Republic Records artists
Musical groups established in 2010
2010 establishments in Tennessee